Cori Dionne "Coco" Gauff (born March 13, 2004) is an American professional tennis player. She has a career-high ranking of world No. 4 in singles, reached on October 24, 2022, and world No. 1 in doubles, achieved on August 15, 2022. Gauff won her first WTA Tour singles title at the 2019 Linz Open aged 15 years and 7 months, making her the youngest singles title-holder on the Tour since 2004. She has won three WTA Tour singles titles and seven doubles titles – three partnering with Caty McNally and four with Jessica Pegula. Gauff rose to prominence with a win over former World No. 1 and seven-time Grand Slam champion Venus Williams in the opening round of 2019 Wimbledon.

Born to parents with NCAA Division I collegiate backgrounds in basketball and track and field, Gauff experimented with a variety of sports as a child. She chose tennis, inspired by the Williams sisters and preferring an individual sport.

Gauff had success as a junior, earning a sponsorship to train at Patrick Mouratoglou's academy in France. She began playing on the ITF Junior Circuit at 13 and finished runner-up at the junior 2017 US Open in just her fourth ITF event, the youngest finalist in the tournament's history. She became the No. 1 junior in the world after winning the junior 2018 French Open singles title over McNally. She also won a junior Grand Slam doubles title at the 2018 US Open, this time partnering McNally.

Gauff made her WTA Tour debut in March 2019 at the Miami Open and won her opening match. She received a wild card into the qualifying draw at the 2019 Wimbledon Championships, where she became the youngest player in the tournament's history to qualify for the main draw. There she reached the fourth round, and each of her matches was the most-watched of the day through the first week of television coverage in the United States. Later that summer, still aged 15, she reached the third round of the US Open. In 2021, she reached her first major final in women's doubles at the US Open, and reached her first major singles final at the 2022 French Open.

Early life
Gauff was born on March 13, 2004, to Candi and Corey Gauff, both of whom are from Delray Beach, Florida. She has two younger brothers, Codey who is four years younger and Cameron who is nine years younger. Her father played college basketball at Georgia State University and later worked as a health care executive, while her mother was a track and field athlete at Florida State University and worked as an educator. Gauff grew up in Atlanta, and became interested in tennis at the age of four after watching Serena Williams win the 2009 Australian Open on television. Her parents encouraged her to try many sports, including basketball and track. She began playing tennis at age six and decided she wanted to pursue it as a career because it was an individual sport and because of her early success in winning the "Little Mo" eight-and-under nationals at the age of eight. Gauff recalled, "I wasn't much of a team person. I loved tennis. I was so-so about it in the beginning because when I was younger I didn't want to practice at all. I just wanted to play with my friends. When I turned eight, that was when I played 'Little Mo' and after that I decided to do that for the rest of my life."

When Gauff was seven, her family moved back to Delray Beach so that she would have better training opportunities. They initially lived with her mother's parents before getting their own house. While in Florida, she worked with Gerard Loglo at the New Generation Tennis Academy starting from age eight. Gauff's parents gave up their careers to focus on training their daughter. Her father later became her primary coach while her mother oversaw her homeschooling. Her father had limited experience playing tennis growing up. At age ten, Gauff began to train at the Mouratoglou Academy in France run by Patrick Mouratoglou, Serena Williams's longtime coach. Mouratoglou commented, "I'll always remember the first time I saw Coco. She came over to the Mouratoglou Academy in 2014 to try out and she impressed me with her determination, athleticism and fighting spirit... When she looks at you and tells you she will be number one, you can only believe it." He helped sponsor Gauff through his Champ'Seed foundation, which he created to provide funding for talented juniors who did not have the financial resources to afford high-level training.

Gauff continued to have success – winning the USTA Clay Court National 12-and-under title at age 10 years and 3 months – to become the youngest champion in the tournament's history.

Junior career
Gauff is a former world No. 1 junior. She entered the prestigious Les Petits As 14-and-under tournament in 2016 at age 12 and made it to the semifinals. Gauff began playing on the ITF Junior Circuit at the age of 13, skipping directly to the highest-level Grade A and Grade 1 tournaments. She finished runner-up to Jaimee Fourlis in her third career event, the Grade 1 Prince George's County Junior Tennis Championships in Maryland. At her next event, Gauff made her junior Grand Slam debut at the 2017 US Open and finished runner-up to Amanda Anisimova. She did not drop a set before the final in either tournament. Gauff became the youngest girls' singles finalist in US Open history.

After beginning 2018 with a semifinal at the Grade 1 Traralgon Junior International in Australia, Gauff lost her opening round match at the Australian Open. She didn't enter another tournament in singles until the French, where she won her first career junior Grand Slam tournament title. She did not drop a set until the final, where she came from behind to defeat McNally in three sets. With the title, Gauff became the fifth youngest girls' singles champion in French Open history. A month later following another final win against McNally at the Grade 1 Junior International Roehampton, she became the No. 1 junior in the world.

Gauff reached the quarterfinals in singles at the final two Grand Slam tournaments of the year. She fared better in doubles at both tournaments, reaching the semifinals at Wimbledon with partner María Lourdes Carlé and winning her first junior Grand Slam doubles title at the US Open with McNally. Gauff and McNally defeated compatriots Hailey Baptiste and Dalayna Hewitt in the final, all in straight sets. In September, Gauff represented the United States at the Junior Fed Cup with Alexa Noel and Connie Ma. The team reached the final against Ukraine. After Gauff won her singles rubber and Noel lost hers, Gauff and Noel won the Junior Fed Cup by defeating Lyubov Kostenko and Dasha Lopatetskaya 11–9 in a match tiebreak. Gauff finished the year with another Grade A title in singles at the Orange Bowl. She ended the season ranked world No. 2 behind Clara Burel.

Professional career

2018–19: First WTA titles, top 100

Gauff made her debut on the ITF Women's Circuit in May 2018 as a qualifier in the $25K event at Osprey, where she won her first professional match. She received a wild card into qualifying at the US Open, but lost her opening match 5 months after turning 14 years old. In her first 2019 tournament, she finished runner-up in doubles at the $100K Midland Tennis Classic alongside Ann Li. Two weeks later, Gauff played her next event at the $25K level in Surprise and reached the finals in both singles and doubles. Although she finished runner-up in singles, she won her maiden WTA title in doubles alongside Paige Hourigan against compatriots Usue Maitane Arconada and Emina Bektas. In March, Gauff made her WTA main draw debut as a wild card at the Miami Open and recorded her first WTA match win against Caty McNally. She lost her next match to Daria Kasatkina.

After losing in the second round of qualifying at the French Open, Gauff qualified for the main draw at Wimbledon, after entering the qualifying draw using a wild card. She upset world No. 92, Aliona Bolsova, the top seed in the qualifying draw, in the first round and defeated No. 128, Greet Minnen, in the third and final qualifying round while only losing two games. Gauff also became the youngest player to reach the main draw at Wimbledon by qualifying in the Open Era at the age of 15 years and 3 months. In her main draw debut, she upset five-time Wimbledon champion Venus Williams in straight sets. She continued her run into the fourth round with victories over Magdaléna Rybáriková and No. 60 Polona Hercog, saving two match points against Hercog. The hype surrounding her first round match win led to her third rounder moving to Centre Court. She was eliminated with a fourth round loss to eventual champion Simona Halep. All four of her matches were most-watched matches on ESPN on their respective days during the first week of coverage. With this performance, Gauff rose to world No. 141.

Gauff played in one US Open Series tournament at the Washington Open, where she qualified for the main draw but lost in the first round. She also entered the doubles event with McNally and defeated Fanny Stollár and Maria Sanchez in the final for their first career WTA title in their first joint WTA. At the US Open, Gauff wild-carded into the singles and doubles main draws. She continued her Grand Slam success in singles with two three-set wins over Anastasia Potapova and Tímea Babos, both on Louis Armstrong. She was defeated in the third round by world No. 1 and defending champion, Naomi Osaka. In doubles, Gauff and McNally also won two matches, including an upset over ninth seeds Nicole Melichar and Kveta Peschke. They lost in the third round to eventual runners-up Ashleigh Barty and Victoria Azarenka. Gauff entered two more tournaments following the US Open. Although she lost in qualifying at the Linz Open, she entered the main draw as a lucky loser and won the title, notably upsetting top seed Kiki Bertens in the quarterfinals for her first top ten victory. She defeated Jeļena Ostapenko in the final to become the youngest WTA player to win a singles title since 2004. With this title as well as a semifinal in doubles with McNally, she made her top 100 debuts in both the WTA singles and doubles rankings. Gauff and McNally ended their year with a second WTA doubles title at the Luxembourg Open over Kaitlyn Christian and Alexa Guarachi.

2020: Australian Open 4th round
Starting the year ranked No. 67, Gauff started 2020 playing at the Auckland Open in New Zealand. In singles she defeated Viktoria Kuzmova before losing to Laura Siegemund in the second round. Playing doubles with McNally, Gauff reached the semifinals, losing to eventual champions Taylor Townsend and Asia Muhammad.

At the Australian Open, Gauff defeated Venus Williams in straight sets in the first round and Sorana Cirstea in the second round, making it three straight Grand Slams where she reached the third round. She defeated defending champion Osaka in the third, becoming the youngest player to defeat a top-5 player since Jennifer Capriati beat Gabriela Sabatini at the 1991 US Open. In the fourth round, she lost to the eventual champion, Sofia Kenin, in three sets. This was her second of three majors she had played where she made it to the second week. In doubles, Gauff and McNally recorded their best result in a Grand Slam championship to date, reaching the quarterfinals before falling to second seeds and eventual champions, Kristina Mladenovic and Tímea Babos, in two sets.

On the resumption of the WTA Tour following the COVID-19 pause, Gauff beat two top-50 players at the Lexington Challenger before losing in straight sets to world No. 49, Jennifer Brady. At the Western and Southern Open, played in New York, Gauff lost in the first round to world No. 21, Maria Sakkari. At the US Open, Gauff was defeated in the first round by Anastasija Sevastova.

As the tour moved onto clay Gauff, ranked 53, beat world No. 34, Ons Jabeur, in the first round of the Italian Open before losing to two-time Grand Slam champion Garbiñe Muguruza. At the French Open, Gauff defeated the ninth seed and world No. 13, Johanna Konta, in the first round, but went on to lose to eventual quarterfinalist Martina Trevisan in a second-round match in which Gauff hit 19 double faults. It was the first time Gauff lost to a player outside the top 100 since she had lost to Tamara Korpatsch in the second round in qualifying at the Linz Open.

The final stages of the 2020 season saw Gauff take a wild card into the qualifying draw at the Ostrava Open. Gauff qualified for the main draw and was defeated by world No. 12, Aryna Sabalenka, in the second round.

2021: Top 20, first major singles quarterfinal & doubles final

Starting the year ranked No. 48, Gauff entered the Abu Dhabi Open, a leadup event to the Australian Open. In the first round, she beat Norwegian Ulrikke Eikeri before falling in the next round to Maria Sakkari. At the Gippsland Trophy, another Australian Open leadup, she beat Jil Teichmann in the round of 64, before falling in the next round to Katie Boulter. In doubles, she and McNally entered the Yarra Valley Classic where they reached the quarterfinals. At the Australian Open, in singles, Gauff again beat Teichmann in the first round, but fell in the round of 64 to the fifth-seeded Elina Svitolina, in straight sets. In doubles, she and McNally fared better, falling to Demi Schuurs and Nicole Melichar in the quarterfinals.

At Adelaide, she was the top seed in qualifying, beating Francesca Jones and the eighth seeded Kaja Juvan to enter the main draw. In a run to the semifinals, all of her matches ran three sets, beating qualifier Jasmine Paolini, sixth seeded Petra Martić, and compatriot Shelby Rogers before falling to second seeded Belinda Bencic. In doubles, she partnered with Canadian Sharon Fichman, and they bowed out in the first round to Duan Yingying and Zheng Saisai. This run brought her to a then-career-high of No. 38 in singles.

She entered the Dubai Championships, where she beat Ekaterina Alexandrova, 12th seed Markéta Vondroušová, and qualifier Tereza Martincová before falling to Jil Teichmann, in straight sets in the quarterfinals. This brought her to a career high of No. 35 in singles.

In the Miami Open, she played her first WTA 1000 event while seeded (as the 31st). After receiving a bye, she lost in a tight three-setter to Sevastova in the round of 64. In the doubles event, she and partner McNally won easily in the first round before beating the second seeded (and then top Porsche Race ranked) team of Barbora Krejčíková and Kateřina Siniaková in a tight three-setter to play Gabriela Dabrowski and Giuliana Olmos in the quarterfinals where they lost.

In May, Gauff reached the first semifinal at a WTA 1000 in her career at the Italian Open due to then-No. 1, Barty, retiring with a right arm injury in their quarterfinal match. As a result, she entered top 30 for the first time. She then lost to the eventual champion, Iga Świątek. At the same tournament, she reached quarterfinals in doubles with Veronika Kudermetova but lost again to eventual champions, alternates pair Dabrowski/Olmos.

In Italy a week later, Gauff won her second singles and third doubles (with McNally) titles at the Emilia-Romagna Open in Parma. She became the youngest player to win both the singles and doubles titles at an event since Maria Sharapova won both titles at the 2004 Birmingham Classic. Gauff thus rose to new career-high rankings of world No. 25 in singles and No. 41 in doubles. Gauff became the youngest American to make her top 25 debut in nearly 23 years (Serena Williams, June 8, 1998).

Seeded 24th at the French Open (her first time being seeded at a Grand Slam), she beat Aleksandra Krunić and Wang Qiang in straight sets, received a walkover when leading one set to love against 13th seed and Australian Open runner-up Jennifer Brady, and beat 25th seed Ons Jabeur in just 53 minutes to reach her first Grand Slam quarterfinal. As a result, she became the youngest female player (17 years, 3 months) to reach a Grand Slam quarterfinal since Nicole Vaidisova at the 2006 French Open, the youngest American to reach a quarterfinal at Roland Garros since Jennifer Capriati in 1993 and the youngest American to reach the quarterfinals of any Grand Slam since Venus Williams reached the 1997 US Open final. Subsequently, Gauff was eliminated after losing in straight sets to the eventual champion, unseeded Barbora Krejčíková. As a result, she reached a new career-high of No. 23 on 14 June 2021.

At Wimbledon, Gauff reached the fourth round for a second consecutive time defeating Elena Vesnina in straight sets in 70 minutes, and Kaja Juvan in straight sets in the third round. Gauff lost her next match to Angelique Kerber in straight sets, eliminating her from the tournament. She also reached the third round in doubles with Caty McNally and as a result entered the top 40 in the doubles rankings at No. 38 on July 12, 2021.

At 17 years old, she was selected for the 2020 Summer Olympics in Tokyo becoming the second youngest American player after Jennifer Capriati competed at 16 and the youngest Olympic tennis player since Mario Ančić in 2000. However, she tested positive for COVID-19 and was forced to withdraw.

She reached the quarterfinals at the Canada Masters in the National Bank Open edition in Montreal after a retirement and a walkover from Anastasia Potapova and Johanna Konta, respectively.

At the Cincinnati Open, Gauff reached the second round. She won her first match against qualifier Hsieh Su-wei in straight sets, but lost to second seed and world No. 2, Naomi Osaka.
 
At the US Open, she beat Magda Linette in the first round before falling to Sloane Stephens in the next. In women's doubles, Gauff and her doubles partner McNally stormed into their first Grand Slam semifinal without dropping a set and defeated the top seeds Hsieh and Mertens in straight sets in the quarterfinals. They progressed to the final when their semifinal opponents, Luisa Stefani and Gabriela Dabrowski, retired after Stefani sustained an injury during the first set tiebreak.  In the final, they lost to Sam Stosur and Zhang Shuai.

2022: First major singles final, singles top 5, doubles No. 1
Seeded 18th at the Australian Open, Gauff lost in the first round against Wang Qiang in straight sets.

In February, she reached the quarterfinals at the Qatar Open by defeating Shelby Rogers, Caroline Garcia and third seed Paula Badosa. In the quarterfinals, she lost to sixth seed Maria Sakkari. In doubles, she paired with Jessica Pegula to win her first WTA 1000 doubles title, beating third seeded pair of Veronika Kudermetova and Elise Mertens in the final. With the win, she climbed to a career high No. 10 in the doubles rankings on 28 February 2022.

Gauff reached her first Grand Slam singles final at the French Open, defeating Rebecca Marino, Alison Van Uytvanck, Kaia Kanepi, 31st seed Elise Mertens, Sloane Stephens, and Martina Trevisan before losing to Iga Świątek in straight sets. She reached the final in doubles with Jessica Pegula where they were defeated by Caroline Garcia and Kristina Mladenovic. As a result, she secured a new career-high of world No. 13 in singles and the top 5 in doubles.

After winning her first two matches at Wimbledon Championships as the 11th seed against unseeded Romanians Elena-Gabriela Ruse and Mihaela Buzărnescu, Gauff lost in the third round to 20th Amanda Anisimova in three sets. As a result, she reached a new career-high ranking of world No. 11, on 11 July 2022.

Seeded sixth at the Silicon Valley Classic, she reached the quarterfinals defeating Anhelina Kalinina in the first round, and next Naomi Osaka who saved seven match points. In her quarterfinal match, she struggled with her serve and lost in straight sets to Paula Badosa.

At the Canadian Open, she became the youngest player to reach back-to-back quarterfinals in Canada since Jennifer Capriati in 1990 and 1991. She beat sixth seed Aryna Sabalenka, a day after ousting Wimbledon champion Elena Rybakina, winning both matches in a third-set tiebreak. She lost to eventual champion Simona Halep, in straight sets. Seeded third in doubles at the same tournament she reached the semifinals with Pegula defeating fifth seeds Desirae Krawczyk and Demi Schuurs. Next they defeated Madison Keys/Sania Mirza in the semifinals and Nicole Melichar/Ellen Perez in the final to win their second WTA 1000 title together. As a result, Gauff became the No. 1 doubles player in the world.

At the US Open, she reached the quarterfinals of this major for the first time with wins over 20th seed Madison Keys and Zhang Shuai becoming the youngest American woman to achieve this feat since 2009, when Melanie Oudin was 17. As a result she guaranteed herself a top 10 debut in the singles rankings at world No. 8 after the tournament. Subsequently, Gauff was defeated by Caroline Garcia, in straight sets. Seeded second in doubles, Gauff and partner Pegula were defeated in the first round by Leylah Fernandez and Daria Saville.

In October, Gauff became the youngest player in singles since Maria Sharapova in 2005 to qualify for the year-end WTA Finals championships. She and partner Jessica Pegula also both qualified for the doubles' championships. Gauff and Pegula are the first Americans since Serena and Venus Williams in 2009 to qualify for both the singles and doubles year-end championships.

2023
Gauff started her 2023 season at the Auckland Open where she defeated Rebeka Masarova in the final in straight sets. At the 2023 Australian Open, Gauff advanced to the fourth round where she lost to Jeļena Ostapenko in straight sets. At the 2023 Qatar Total Open, Gauff reached the quarterfinals after defeating two time champion Petra Kvitová in the second round. At the same tournament in doubles, Gauff and Jessica Pegula successfully defended their title defeating Lyudmyla Kichenok and Jelena Ostapenko in a three set match. At the 2023 Dubai Tennis Championships, she reached the semifinals after defeating Madison Keys in the quarterfinals before losing to Iga Świątek.

Endorsements
Gauff uses a Head Boom MP 2022 with 16 main and 19 cross strings. She wears New Balance clothing and tennis shoes.

In October 2018, Gauff signed her first multi-year sponsorship contract, with New Balance. At the 2021 French Open, Gauff wore a New Balance outfit of bold mismatched color splotches to contrast with the all white ensemble of doubles partner Venus Williams.

In March 2019, she announced a multi-year sponsorship agreement with Italian food company Barilla, which also sponsors Roger Federer.

Personal life
Gauff's tennis idols are Serena and Venus Williams. "Serena Williams has always been my idol...and Venus," she has said. "They are the reason why I wanted to pick up a tennis racquet." Gauff first met Serena when she won the Little Mo national tournament at the age of eight, and later met her again to film a commercial for Delta Air Lines and at the Mouratoglou Academy. After defeating Venus at Wimbledon in 2019, Gauff commended Venus when they shook hands at the net. "I was just telling her thank you for everything she's done for the sport," she said. "She's been an inspiration for many people. I was just really telling her thank you."

In a 2020 post on "Behind the Racquet," created by professional tennis player Noah Rubin, Gauff stated she had experienced depression and stress related to her sporting career. Her parents clarified that she was not diagnosed with depression in the clinical sense, and had not sought medical attention relating to her psychological wellbeing.

Career statistics

Grand Slam tournament performance timelines

Singles

Doubles

Grand Slam tournament finals

Singles: 1 (runner-up)

Doubles: 2 (2 runner-ups)

References

External links

 
 

2004 births
Living people
American female tennis players
African-American female tennis players
French Open junior champions
Tennis players from Atlanta
Tennis people from Florida
Sportspeople from Delray Beach, Florida
Grand Slam (tennis) champions in girls' singles
Grand Slam (tennis) champions in girls' doubles
21st-century African-American sportspeople
21st-century African-American women